is a Japanese footballer who plays for Kagoshima United FC.

Career
After being picked as captain for his University football team, Fujisawa was signed by JFL-team Sagawa Shiga FC. He even had a brief stint in 5th German football division with SC Viktoria 06 Griesheim, but he was released after few months. Returned in Japan, he signed for FC Ryūkyū.

Club statistics
Updated to end of 2018 season.

References

External links
Profile at FC Ryukyu

1988 births
Living people
Kansai University alumni
Association football people from Kyoto Prefecture
Japanese footballers
J3 League players
Japan Football League players
Sagawa Shiga FC players
FC Ryukyu players
Kagoshima United FC players
Association football midfielders